Mariia Tailakova (born 12 March 2001) is a Russian table tennis player. Her highest career ITTF ranking was 84.

References

2001 births
Living people
Russian female table tennis players